Eirmotus is a genus of cyprinid fish that is found in Southeast Asia.  There are currently four recognized species in this genus.

Species
 Eirmotus furvus H. H. Tan & Kottelat, 2008
 Eirmotus insignis H. H. Tan & Kottelat, 2008
 Eirmotus isthmus H. H. Tan & Kottelat, 2008
 Eirmotus octozona L. P. Schultz, 1959

References

 

Cyprinid fish of Asia
Cyprinidae genera